Camerota is a town and comune in the province of Salerno in the Campania region of south-western Italy.

History
Its toponym could come from the Greek word "καμαρὸτος" (kamaròtos), meaning curved; or from the Latin word "camurus", with the same meaning.

Geography 
Camerota is a hill town situated in the southern area of Cilento, 6 km north of the Cilentan Coast. The municipality borders with Celle di Bulgheria, Centola, Roccagloriosa and San Giovanni a Piro.

Frazioni

The municipality of Camerota (1,585 inh. in the chief town) has 3 hamlets 
("frazioni"): Lentiscosa, Licusati and Marina di Camerota.

The municipality includes also several inhabited localities, mainly composed by few scattered houses. The localities are: Cala d'Arconte, Isca della Contessa, L'Assunta, Lido Mingardo (or Spiaggia Mingardo), Monte di Luna and Porto Infreschi.

See also
Bulgheria
Cilentan dialect
Cilento and Vallo di Diano National Park

References

External links

 Official website 

Localities of Cilento